Admiral Sir Graham Moore,  (1764–1843) was a Royal Navy officer. As a junior officer he took part in the Great Siege of Gibraltar during the American Revolutionary War. As captain of the frigate , he took part in the Battle of Tory Island in October 1798, capturing the  two days later, during the French Revolutionary Wars. He went on to be First Naval Lord, then Commander-in-Chief, Mediterranean Fleet, and finally, Commander-in-Chief, Plymouth. He was the younger brother of General Sir John Moore.

Naval career
Moore was born in Glasgow, Scotland, the son of Jean Simson and John Moore, doctor and author. He entered the Navy in 1777 at the age of 13. He was promoted to lieutenant on 8 March 1782 to serve aboard , taking part in the relief of Gibraltar under Lord Howe, and the subsequent battle of Cape Spartel in October. On 22 November 1790 he was promoted to commander in the sloop , before finally returning to England in 1793.

Moore was promoted to post-captain on 2 April 1794, soon after the start of the Revolutionary War, with command of the 32-gun frigate , in the North Sea and the coast of France. He then commanded the 36-gun frigate  from September 1795. In her he took part in the Battle of Tory Island on 12 October 1798, capturing the  two days later. In February 1800 he went out to the West Indies, but was invalided home after eighteen months.

Moore was then attached to Sir Robert Calder's squadron blockading Ferrol. In 1808, he served as commodore, flying his broad pennant in the new ship  assisting Admiral Sir Sidney Smith with the Portuguese royal family's escape to Brazil, and was subsequently made a Knight of the Order of the Tower and Sword.

He later served as part of the North Sea fleet for several years. At the close of the Walcheren campaign in December 1809, he was entrusted with destroying the basin, arsenal, and sea defences of Flushing (Vlissingen).

In 1814 he served as captain of the fleet to Lord Keith in the Channel, and, having been appointed a Knight Commander of the Order of the Bath on 2 January 1815, he became second-in-command, Mediterranean Fleet in 1815. He joined the Board of Admiralty as First Naval Lord in the Liverpool ministry in May 1816.

Promoted to vice-admiral on 12 August 1819, he left the Board of the Admiralty in March 1820. He was Commander-in-Chief, Mediterranean Fleet between 1820 and 1823 and was advanced to Knight Grand Cross of the Order of the Bath on 11 March 1836.

Moore died at his home, Brook Farm, Cobham, Surrey, on 25 November 1843, and was buried at St. Andrew's Church.

Family
In 1812 he married Dora Eden, daughter of Thomas Eden, and niece of William Eden, 1st Baron Auckland; they had one son, Captain John Moore, RN (d. 1866).

Diary
Moore kept a detailed diary from 1784 until 1843, comprising thirty-four volumes, which provide a unique account of his service as a lieutenant, commander and captain. The diary is held at Cambridge University Library.

Namesakes
Several places were named in his honour: the Sir Graham Moore Islands, Cape Graham Moore, and Graham Moore Bay, in northern Canada were named by William Parry, while the Sir Graham Moore Islands, Western Australia, were named by Phillip Parker King.

References

Sources

Further reading

External links

|-

|-

1764 births
1843 deaths
Military personnel from Glasgow
Lords of the Admiralty
Royal Navy admirals
Royal Navy personnel of the French Revolutionary Wars
Royal Navy personnel of the Napoleonic Wars
British diarists
Royal Navy personnel of the American Revolutionary War
Recipients of the Order of the Tower and Sword